The 2005–06 Toyota Racing Series was the second Toyota Racing Series season. It began on November 4, 2005 at Pukekohe and ended on April 23, 2006, also at Pukekohe.

Teams and drivers
The following teams and drivers have competed during the 2005–06 Toyota Racing Series. All teams used Tatuus TT104ZZ chassis with Toyota engine.

*Competed in one round only.

**Competed in two rounds only.

International Drivers
The 2005/06 Toyota Racing Series featured four overseas drivers. Two British drivers (Jay Howard, Ben Clucas), Stefen Møller from Denmark and Hamad Al Fardan from Bahrain.

Calendar

*International Series

**V8 Supercar support race.

References
toyotaracing.co.nz

Toyota Racing Series
Toyota Racing Series
Toyota Racing Series